This article lists the memorials and cemeteries around the area of the river Somme.

Memorial to the Liverpool and Manchester Pals at Montauban

7th Yorkshire Regiment Memorial at Fricourt

Statue of Marshal Foch at Bouchavesnes

Memorial to 18th Division at Thiepval

Memorial to the 46th Division at Bellenglise

Memorial at Flers

The New Zealand Memorial at Longueval

New Zealand Memorial to the Missing at Caterpillar Valley Cemetery

Memorial to the 38th (Welsh) Division at Mametz Wood
Mametz Wood was to be the scene of some of the bloodiest fighting of the opening days of the Battle of the Somme as taking the wood involved advancing uphill and over open ground whilst facing heavy machine gun fire and artillery. By 12 July the woods had been cleared of Germans but at a heavy cost with over 4,000 Welsh deaths and casualties. The Mametz memorial takes the form of a Welsh dragon challenging the wood to its fore. At one side of the base is carved the regimental cap badge of the South Wales Borderers. The sculptural work was by David Petersen.

The 38th (Welsh) Division was very much the result of personal initiatives by Lloyd George and was the Welsh equivalent of the "Pals" battalions from the North of England.  So awful was the fighting here that a Welsh soldier, Wyn Griffith, described it as "the horror of our way of life and death and of our crucifixion of youth".

Joint Memorial to the Black Watch and Cameron Highlanders

Australian First Division Memorial at Pozières

The Tank Memorial at Pozières

The Windmill Memorial at Pozières

The Mouquet Farm at Pozières

The Kings Royal Rifle Corps Memorial at Pozières

The Pozières British Cemetery and the Pozières Memorial to the Missing

The Thiepval Memorial

Memorial to the men of the 36th (Ulster)  Division at Thiepval

The Canadian Memorial at Courcelette

Memorials at Ovillers-la-Boisselle: The Lochnagar Crater

Memorial to the 102nd and 103rd Tyneside Infantry Brigades at La Boiselle

Memorial to the 19th (Western) Division at La Boiselle

The 34th Division Memorial at La Boiselle

Serre Road

The South African Memorial at Delville Wood

Images of Delville Wood

Memorial to the 20th Light Division

Memorial to the 16th (Irish) Division at Guillemont

Guillemont Road Cemetery

Trônes Wood and the 18th Division Memorial

Guards Division Memorial on the road from Ginchy to Lesboeufs

The Memorial to the "Bradford Pals" at Hébuterne

French Military Cemetery at Rancourt

German Military Cemetery at Rancourt

The  Grévillers British Cemetery and the  Grévillers Memorial

Rancourt British Cemetery

Memorial to the "Salford Pals" at Authuile

The Australian Memorial at Villers-Bretonneux

Newfoundland Memorial Park

Beaucourt Naval Division Memorial

The Piper's Memorial at Longueval

The McCrae's Battalion Memorial

Gallery of images

See also
 List of World War I Memorials and Cemeteries in Alsace
 List of World War I memorials and cemeteries in the Argonne
 List of World War I memorials and cemeteries in Artois
 List of World War I memorials and cemeteries in Champagne-Ardennes
 List of World War I memorials and cemeteries in Flanders
 List of World War I Memorials and Cemeteries in Lorraine
 List of World War I memorials and cemeteries in Verdun
 List of World War I memorials and cemeteries in the area of the St Mihiel salient

Further reading
 Alexandre Thers. "La Somme L'offensive traqique".   
 "Illustrated Michelin Guides to the Battlefields (1914–1918)".  and 0 904775 19 4 both cover The Somme, the first in 1916 and the second in 1918.
 "Michelin's Illustrated Guides to the Battlefields (1914–1918). Amiens". .
 Ian Uys. "Longueval". 
 Ray Westlake. "Kitchener's Army" 
 "Illustrated Michelin Guides to the Battlefields (1914–1918). Soissons" .
 G. Gliddon. "VCs Handbook. The Western Front 1914–1918" 
 P. Longworth. "The Unending Vigil" 
 M. Brown. "Book of the Somme" 
 Ian Uys. "Delville Wood" 
 A.H. Farrar-Hockley. "The Somme" 
 Lyn MacDonald. Somme 
 Chris McCarthy. "The Somme. The Day-by-Day Account" 
 Jack Alexander. "McCrae's Battalion"

References

External links
 France-Searchable French website Enables searches to be made for French soldiers killed in 1914–1918
 Australia- Australian Government website covering the Australian Imperial Force An excellent website for matters concerning the Australian Imperial Force.
 Canada-Canadian Government website Again has facilities to search for Canadian service records of the 1914–1918 war.
 Germany-German website Comprehensive details of German cemeteries, etc.

Somme
Somme
Somme
Buildings and structures in Somme (department)
Somme, river

Tourist attractions in Somme (department)
World War I in the Somme
Somme
Memorials and Cemeteries in the Somme